The 2019 Nigerian Senate elections in Bornu State were held on 23 February 2019, to elect members of the Nigerian Senate to represent Bornu State. Governor Shettima Kashim representing Bornu Central, Kyari Abubakar Shaib representing Bornu North, and Ndume Mohammed Ali representing Bornu South all won on the platform of All Progressives Congress.

Overview

Summary

Results

Bornu Central 
A total of 20 candidates registered with the Independent National Electoral Commission to contest in the election. APC candidate Shettima Kashim won the election, defeating PDP candidate Muhammed Abba Aji and 18 other party candidates. Shettima received 80.90% of the votes, while Abba-Aji received 17.83%.

Bornu North 
A total of 8 candidates registered with the Independent National Electoral Commission to contest in the election. APC candidate Kyari Abubakar Shaib won the election, defeating PDP candidate Isa Lawan and 6 other party candidates. Shaib received 67.69% of the votes, while Lawan received 31.70%.

Bornu South 
A total of 11 candidates registered with the Independent National Electoral Commission to contest in the election. APC candidate Ndume Mohammed Ali won the election, defeating PDP  candidate Kudla Milinda Satumari and 9 other party candidates. Ndume received 75.53% of the votes, while Satumari received 21.25%.

References 

Borno State senatorial elections
Borno State Senate elections